Samuel Freeman may refer to:

Sam Freeman (baseball) (born 1987), American baseball pitcher
Samuel Freeman (engraver) (1773–1857), English engraver
Samuel Freeman (Canadian politician) (1824–1902), merchant and political figure in Nova Scotia, Canada
Samuel Freeman (philosopher), American philosopher
Samuel Freeman (priest) (1644–1707), Dean of Peterborough

See also

Samuel Freedman (disambiguation)